Glenea florensis is a species of beetle in the family Cerambycidae. It was described by Ritsema in 1892. It is known from Indonesia.

References

florensis
Beetles described in 1892